Dulcinea is an album by Toad the Wet Sprocket released in 1994. It is their fourth studio album with Columbia Records and the follow-up to their popular album fear, which was released in 1991. Two songs from Dulcinea charted on the Modern Rock and Mainstream Rock charts: "Fall Down" and "Something's Always Wrong". Dulcinea was RIAA Certified Gold on September 1, 1994 and Platinum on July 31, 1995.

The album's name is a reference to the love interest in Miguel de Cervantes' classic Spanish novel, Don Quixote.  At least two songs on the album allude to themes found in the novel. "Crowing" is a song about a person who does not know how to hold on to a lover. "Windmills" is a metaphorical song about how people spend much of their lives chasing absurd or impossible pursuits  (the allusion being to a specific scene in Don Quixote where the title character uselessly attacks a windmill). The album's artwork (illustrated by artist Jason Holley) also explores Cervantes' windmill metaphor, depicting the incongruence between the way things are and how people tend to perceive them.

Dulcinea also delves into some spiritual themes. "Fly from Heaven" is sung from the perspective of James, who is portrayed as Jesus' literal brother and is upset by Paul's manipulation of Jesus' word. "Begin" and "Reincarnation Song" each explore questions about death and the afterlife.

Glen Phillips has said that Dulcinea is probably his favorite Toad album because they started to know what they were doing but weren't overthinking things yet.

Track listing

Other tracks recorded during the album's 1993 sessions included "Crazy Life" (later released on the Empire Records soundtrack and remixed by Tom Lord-Alge for Coil) as well as an alternate take of "Reincarnation Song" and two tracks, "Hope" and "All Right" which would be released on In Light Syrup the following year.

Personnel
Dean Dinning – bass, keyboards, backing vocals
Randy Guss – drums, percussion
Todd Nichols – guitars, backing vocals
Glen Phillips – lead vocals, guitars, keyboards

Charts

Certifications

References

Toad the Wet Sprocket albums
1994 albums
Columbia Records albums
Music based on Don Quixote